Downtown Aquarium (formerly Colorado's Ocean Journey) is a public aquarium and restaurant located in Denver, Colorado at the intersection of I-25 and 23rd Ave. The  main building sits on a  site adjacent to the South Platte River.

The Downtown Aquarium in Denver is owned and operated by Landry's Restaurants, Inc. It is accredited by the Association of Zoos and Aquariums (AZA).

History
Colorado's Ocean Journey was founded by Bill Fleming and Judy Petersen Fleming as a nonprofit entity.  It was partially funded by a $57 million bond loan as well as loans by the department of Housing and Urban Development, and its total cost was $93 million. The facility opened June 21, 1999 and soon earned accreditation by the Association of Zoos and Aquariums (AZA).

It was originally called "Ocean Journey" to teach visitors how we, in Colorado, impact the whole planet via the Colorado River that flowed to the Sea of Cortez and the Pacific Ocean.  It was designed and built to teach environmental and ecological messages about ecosystems in the mountains, rivers and the sea.  There were two journeys (rivers): the Colorado and the Kampar in Indonesia, hence the tigers, birds, etc.  It was never intended to be a seafood restaurant.  Quite the opposite.

Although the aquarium was highly successful and the attendance was high for years, Mayor Wellington Webb chose to invest over 100 million building a new competitive Aquarium at the Denver Zoo and fought Ocean Journey at every turn.  Denver did not need two aquariums and so, funding and attendance suffered at both.  And after the 9/11 tragedy in 2001, the number of visitors fell drastically within a few months, and the aquarium failed to meet its attendance projections of over a million visitors per year, in part because of a downturn in the U.S. economy. The aquarium was not able to make payments on its high construction debt, and Colorado Ocean Journey Liquidation Inc. filed bankruptcy April 2002 with a $62.5 million debt. After a last-minute bidding war with Ripley's Entertainment, Landry's Restaurants, Inc. purchased the facility in March 2003 for $13.6 million.

After the purchase, the facility remained open to the public until the summer of 2005, when it closed briefly for renovations. These included the addition of a full-service restaurant, bar, and ballroom. A  marine aquarium was added to the restaurant area. Upon its reopening July 14, 2005, the facility was renamed Downtown Aquarium.

Exhibits

A major theme for this landlocked aquarium is the relationship between inland freshwater ecosystems and the ocean.  The original design of the aquarium was zoogeographic. It focused on the path to the ocean taken by two rivers, the Colorado River in North America and the Kampar River in Indonesia. The Colorado River Journey included exhibits of endangered fish, including desert pupfish; gamefish such as bass; and North American river otters, among other species. It ended with a large exhibit depicting the Sea of Cortez (Gulf of California), into which the actual Colorado River empties. The Indonesia River Journey included exhibits of animals such as Asian arowanas, rainbowfish, and endangered Sumatran tigers, among other species. It ended with a large exhibit depicting the southern Pacific Ocean. In addition to these two journeys, the aquarium housed a large sea otter exhibit.

After the 2005 renovations, the two journey paths remain, but are no longer arranged in a strictly zoogeographic pattern.  For example, tanks on the second pathway (formerly the Kampar River Journey) depict African and South American freshwater ecosystems; other tanks are mixed community aquaria.  The sea otter exhibit was moved to the North America exhibit area, and replaced with North American river otters (Lontra canadensis), to make room for the restaurant tank.

The facility features several interactive exhibits, including a horseshoe crab touch tank and a stingray touch-and-feed tank.

The aquarium continues to focus on conservation.  To that end, it houses numerous endangered or threatened species:  12 species of fish, six of reptiles, two of mammals, and two of birds.  It participates in the AZA's Species Survival Plan for Sumatran tigers.

Education
A volunteer program administered by the Deep Blue Sea Foundation, a nonprofit group, is in place.  The Deep Blue Sea Foundation was formed after Landry's purchased the aquarium to ensure the educational goals of the original founders would continue to be met.  The aquarium also periodically hosts for-cost educational seminars.

References

External links

Aquaria in Colorado
Buildings and structures in Denver
Tourist attractions in Denver
Restaurants in Colorado